Elaeocarpus colnettianus is a species of flowering plant in the Elaeocarpaceae family. It is found only in New Caledonia.

See also
 List of Elaeocarpus species

References

colnettianus
Endemic flora of New Caledonia
Vulnerable plants
Taxonomy articles created by Polbot